Potonggang-guyok is one of the 18 districts, or guyok, of Pyongyang, North Korea. It is most famous as the location of the Ryugyong Hotel.  It is named after the Pothong River (literally "the simple river"), which serves as the district's border on all sides. It is bordered to the north by Hyongjesan-guyok, to the east by Sosong and Moranbong-guyoks, to the south by Pyongchon and Chung-guyoks, and to the west by Mangyongdae-guyok. The district was established by the Pyongyang City People's Committee in October 1960.

Overview
The Pot'ong District is surrounded by Pothong River and Pothonggang Canal. The district is primarily a working district of the city as the few places of interest to tourists on located on the periphery of the district.  The only attractions open to visitors are the Potong River Pleasure Ground, the Victorious Liberation of the Fatherland Statue and the Potong River Improvement Project Monument.  It is also the location of the Pyongyang Embroidery School and Factory, and the Pyongyang Senior Middle School.  The district's Ragwon-dong is the location of the central offices and headquarters of the DPRK's National Defense Commission.

The Pyongyang Metro runs through this district, with stops at Konsol, Hwanggumbol, and Konguk stations.

Administrative divisions
Potonggang-guyok is divided into fifteen administrative districts known as tong (neighborhoods):

References

Districts of Pyongyang